"Daydream" is a popular song written by John Sebastian, first released in 1966. It was originally recorded that year by Sebastian's group the Lovin' Spoonful and appeared on their album of the same title. 
Sebastian played the harmonica, as well as doing his own whistling in the instrumental section plus the coda before the song's fade.

Background
"Daydream" originated with Sebastian's attempt to rewrite The Supremes' "Baby Love".
John Sebastian spoke about the success of the song:

This song influenced the Beatles. John Lennon's jukebox included both this and "Do You Believe in Magic." It was also a major inspiration for Paul McCartney's Beatles composition "Good Day Sunshine."

Billboard described the song as "An off-beat shuffle-blues rhythm that will quickly equal their 'You Didn't Have to Be So Nice' success."  Cash Box described the single as an "easy-going, funky blues-soaked happy-go-lucky item with a real infectious chorus portion."

Chart performance
The song reached No. 2 on the U.S. Billboard Hot 100, behind (You're My) Soul and Inspiration by The Righteous Brothers.  Outside the US, "Daydream" went to No. 2 on the UK Singles Chart. In New Zealand, the song spent three weeks at No. 1. It also reached No. 1 in Canada, and No. 13 in Australia.

Charts

Weekly charts

Year-end charts

Recorded versions
Following the 1966 Lovin' Spoonful recording, "Daydream" has been recorded by such artists as:
Chet Atkins, on his 1988 album, C.G.P. 
Otto Brandenburg (in Danish, under the title "Dagdrøm") (1966) 
David Cassidy, Bell catalog number #45-386, released July 5, 1973, with the flip side "Can't Go Home Again" 
Bobby Darin, on his December 1966 album If I Were a Carpenter 
Dino, Desi, & Billy, on their May 1966 album Memories Are Made of This 
Art Garfunkel, on his June 1997 album Songs from a Parent to a Child 
Vince Gill and Kermit the Frog for the 1994 album Kermit Unpigged. This version peaked at No. 65 on the RPM Country Tracks chart in Canada.
Gary Lewis and the Playboys, on their 1966 album Hits Again 
Lars Lilholt Band (November 24, 2008) (in Danish, under the title "Dagdrømmerdreng") 
The Guess Who performed this song on CBC Winnipeg's radio show "The Swingers" in 1967.
The Mar-Keys, on their 1969 album Damifiknow!
Maria Muldaur (1989) 
Ricky Nelson, on his album Another Side of Rick, released November 13, 1967
Right Said Fred, on their 1992 single ""Those Simple Things"/"Daydream"
Lewis Ross, on his 1996 album of the same name
The Sandpipers, on their 1967 album Misty Roses
Bud Shank (1967) 
Sheila (in French, under the title "Le rêve") (June 1966) 
The Sweet, on their album Funny How Sweet Co-Co Can Be, released in 1971 
Bill Wyman's Rhythm Kings recorded it for their third album, Groovin', in 2000.
Candye Kane, on her album White Trash Girl, released in November 1971 
Doris Day - My Heart (2011)
Terry Holley, on his 2010 album Acoustic Covers
Mike Vickers, on his 1968 album I Wish I Were a Group Again.
M. Ward feat. Alia Farah as a single in 2020.

References

External links
 

1966 singles
The Lovin' Spoonful songs
Songs written by John Sebastian
Cashbox number-one singles
RPM Top Singles number-one singles
Number-one singles in New Zealand
Number-one singles in Sweden
1966 songs
Vince Gill songs
Song recordings produced by Erik Jacobsen
Kama Sutra Records singles